Htoo may refer to
Htoo (name)
Htoo Foundation in Myanmar
Htoo Group of Companies in Myanmar